TCB may refer to:

Companies and organizations
 Taiwan Cooperative Bank, a bank of Taiwan
 The Conference Board, a non-profit business membership and research group organization in New York City
 Touring Club Belgium, a motoring organization in Belgium
 Transportes Charter do Brasil, a cargo airline in São Paulo, Brazil

Computing
 Task Control Block, an instance of a process control block within IBM OS/360 and successor systems
 Thread control block, a data structure in the operating system kernel 
 Trusted computing base, a set of computer components critical to its security
 Temenos Core Banking, banking software from Temenos Group
 Transmission Control Block, a data structure used by a Transmission Control Protocol stack

Music
 TCB (album), James Reyne's album of Elvis Presley cover songs
 TCB (band), an early 1970s Canadian rock group
 TCB Band, rhythm section of Elvis Presley's band

Science
 TCB-2, a hallucinogenic phenethylamine compound
 Trichlorobenzene, an organic chemical
 Temps-Coordonnée Barycentrique (Barycentric Coordinate Time), a coordinate time standard in astronomy
 TCB meter (transcutaneous bilirubin meter), a device which measures bilirubin level

Other
 TCB (TV program), 1968 Motown television special and album
 TCB, IATA code for Treasure Cay Airport in The Bahamas
 TCB, NYSE symbol for TCF Financial Corporation
 TCB, Ordnance Survey map code for a telephone call box
 TCB spline ("tension, continuity, and bias"), in mathematics, another term for a Kochanek–Bartels spline
 Telecommunication Certification Body, compliance agency re Federal Communications Commission (FCC) rules and regulations
 Track circuit block, name used in the United Kingdom for automatic block signalling on railways

See also
 Taking Care of Business (disambiguation)
 Telephone Company Building (disambiguation)